Omalocephala is a genus of planthoppers belonging to the family Fulgoridae.

Species
Fulgoromorpha Lists On the WEB (FLOW) includes:
 Omalocephala cincta (Fabricius, 1803) - West Africa
 Omalocephala festiva (Fabricius, 1781) - type species - India (Tamil Nadu), Sri Lanka
 Omalocephala intermedia (Bolivar, 1879) - Tanzania (Zanzibar)

References

Auchenorrhyncha genera
Aphaeninae